Levinson v. United States, 258 U.S. 198 (1922), was a United States Supreme Court governing the sale by the United States Navy of the yacht USS Wadena (SP-158). The yacht, previously having been used by the Navy in World War I, was auctioned off after the war ended. Levinson and Johnson both submitted bids. Johnson's was the higher bid, but his bid was lost, inadvertently assigned to a different vessel. The Navy subsequently sold and delivered title to the yacht to Levinson. Johnson sued, and the Navy joined in the suit as a stakeholder, supporting Johnson's claim.

The U.S. District Court initially ruled in favor of Levinson. However, on appeal Second Circuit Court of Appeals reversed, removing the government from the suit, on the ground that it was not a party to the controversy, and awarded the yacht to Johnson. The Supreme Court reversed the court of appeals, holding that the district court had been correct on both issues: it was appropriate for the Navy to participate in the suit, and that Levinson should be awarded the boat.

References

External links
 

United States federal case law
United States Supreme Court cases
1922 in United States case law
United States Supreme Court cases of the White Court